The Federal Correctional Institution, Bennettsville (FCI Bennettsville) is a medium-security United States federal prison for male inmates in South Carolina. It is operated by the Federal Bureau of Prisons, a division of the United States Department of Justice. The facility also includes an adjacent prison camp for minimum-security male inmates.

FCI Bennettsville is located in northeast South Carolina, approximately 70 miles from Myrtle Beach and 100 miles from Columbia, the state capital.

See also
List of U.S. federal prisons
Federal Bureau of Prisons
Incarceration in the United States

References 

Buildings and structures in Marlboro County, South Carolina
Bennettsville
Prisons in South Carolina